Aluminium silicate (or aluminum silicate) is a name commonly applied to chemical compounds which are derived from aluminium oxide, Al2O3 and silicon dioxide, SiO2 which may be anhydrous or hydrated, naturally occurring as minerals or synthetic. Their chemical formulae are often expressed as xAl2O3·ySiO2·zH2O. It is known as E number E559.

Examples

 Al2SiO5, (Al2O3·SiO2), which occurs naturally as the minerals andalusite, kyanite and sillimanite which have different crystal structures.
 Al2Si2O5(OH)4, (Al2O3·2SiO2·2H2O), which occurs naturally as the mineral kaolinite and is also called aluminium silicate dihydrate. It is a fine white powder and is used as a filler in paper and rubber and also used in paints.
 Al6Si2O13, (3Al2O3·2SiO2), the mineral mullite, the only thermodynamically stable intermediate phase in the Al2O3-SiO2 system at atmospheric pressure. This also called '3:2 mullite' to distinguish it from 2Al2O3·SiO2, Al4SiO8 '2:1 mullite'.
 2Al2O3·SiO2, Al4SiO8 '2:1 mullite'.

Aluminium silicate composite materials, fibres
Aluminium silicate is a type of fibrous material made of aluminium oxide and silicon dioxide, (such materials are also called aluminosilicate fibres). These are glassy solid solutions rather than chemical compounds. The compositions are often  described in terms of % weight of alumina, Al2O3 and silica, SiO2. Temperature resistance increases as the % alumina increases. These fibrous materials can be encountered as loose wool, blanket, felt, paper or boards.

References

External links
Aluminum silicates at the University of Waterloo, Canada

Silicates
Silicates
Orthorhombic minerals
E-number additives